The Labor Code of Ukraine (Kodeks zakoniv pro pratsyu Ukrayiny) is the national code of laws about labor. The code was adopted and ratified at a session of the Verkhovna Rada (parliament) of Ukrainian SSR (Soviet Union) on 10 December 1971.

Structure
The Labor Code of Ukraine is divided into 18 chapters:

 General Principles
 Collective Agreement
 Labor Agreement
 Providing employment to laid-off workers
 Working Hours
 Resting Hours
 Normalization of Labor
 Payment for Work
 Guarantees and Compensations
 Warranties for laying onto employees a liability for damage caused to enterprises, institutions, organizations
 Job discipline
 Job security
 Female Labor
 Youth Labor
 Employee benefits that combine work with study
 Individual Labor Disputes
 Trade unions. Employee participation in managing an enterprise, institution, organization
 Labor team
 Compulsory state social insurance and pension provision
 Supervision and control over the observance of labor legislation

See also
 Constitution of Ukraine
 Law of Ukraine

References

External links
 Labor Code of Ukraine Official document.

Law of Ukraine
Politics of Ukraine
1971 in law